Pine Bowl may refer to:

 Pine Bowl (Stadium), a football stadium in Loretto, Pennsylvania
 Pine Bowl (game), an American football championship game held in Japan